Adrian Cornelius Langerwerf (born Adrianus Cornelis Langerwerf; 15 September 1876 – 7 April 1935) was a New Zealand Catholic missionary and writer. He was born in Waspik, Netherlands, the son of Cornelis Bartels Langerwerf (1835–1881) and Lucia Smeur (1845–1890), on 15 September 1876.

References

1876 births
1935 deaths
People from Waalwijk
Dutch Roman Catholic missionaries
New Zealand writers
New Zealand Roman Catholics
Dutch emigrants to New Zealand
Roman Catholic missionaries in New Zealand